Vue Privée [vp], is an art gallery space located in Singapore as well as an E-commerce website. It pays particular attention and focus on limited edition artworks, merchandise, events and a lifestyle that is inspired by photography. Vue Privée offers limited edition prints in three distinct series that cater to different interests of collectors.

The gallery is housed at the heart of Orchard Road, Singapore's premiere retail and shopping district. The space consists of two floors of exhibition and retail area located in a  pre-war Peranakan shophouse.

Collections and Exhibitions 
The collections in [vp] consists of works from international contemporary artists. A more permanent collection is kept on display at the first level, while an ongoing line-up of curated exhibitions are displayed on the second floor.

La Collection Vue Privée 
La Collection Vue Privée is a private collection of over 9,000 items including historic photographs, albums, cameras, and other photography related materials. The historic photographs contained within the collection date back to the birth of photography in the 1830s to the WW2 era. This collection is actively becoming an archive of the photographic medium and an asset to the business and the public. Items from the collection will periodically be on display, and used as inspiration for limited edition prints and other merchandise developed in collaboration with Vue Privée represented artists.

Influence on the Singapore Art Scene 
Time Out Singapore has ranked the gallery as one of the 50 movers and shakers in the Singapore Art scene. Since the gallery's conception it has also been featured frequently in local publications like The Straits Times, The Business Times and Tatler Singapore.

See also 
Fine-Art Photography
Contemporary Art

References 

Art museums and galleries in Singapore